Tenacibaculum todarodis is a Gram-negative, aerobic and rod-shaped bacterium from the genus of Tenacibaculum which has been isolated from a squid (Todarodes pacificus) from the Sea of Japan in Korea.

References 

Flavobacteria
Bacteria described in 2018